Colegio Sagrado Corazón (Sacred Heart School) may refer to:
 Colegio Sagrado Corazón (Chile), a high school in Rancagua, Cachapoal Province, Chile
 Colegio Sagrado Corazón de Jesús, a high school in Quinta de Tilcoco, Cachapoal Province, Chile
 Maristas Colegio Sagrado Corazón Valencia, a school in Valencia, Spain